Michel Heydens is a Belgian racecar driver who is best known for his 2004 part-season with the Perspective-Porsche team of Le Mans Endurance Series.

References

External links

Year of birth missing (living people)
Living people
Belgian racing drivers
European Le Mans Series drivers
Place of birth missing (living people)
21st-century Belgian people